Helen Clare Belcher  (born 30 October 1963) is a British transgender activist and Liberal Democrat politician. She has been featured in The Independent on Sunday’s Rainbow List for her work on LGBT issues, particularly those affecting the trans community. In 2010 she co-founded Trans Media Watch, a trans-awareness charity for which she appeared on Newsnight. Belcher stood unsuccessfully for Parliament in Chippenham at the 2017 and 2019 general elections.

Early life 
Belcher was born in Reading, where she attended a local grammar school before graduating from the University of Leeds in 1984. She worked initially as a maths teacher in Boston Spa but later moved into computer software, establishing her own software company in 2004.  She is a trans woman who transitioned in 2004.

Political career and activism 
In 2012, Belcher gave evidence to the Leveson Inquiry, an investigation into the culture, practices and ethics of the press. She gave evidence again in 2015 for the Women and Equalities Select Committee's inquiry into trans equality, and in 2017 for the Joint Parliamentary Committee of Human Rights' inquiry into free speech.

The Times withdrew from the 2018 Comments Awards when Belcher, a judge on the panel, asked for her name to be removed following the nomination of Janice Turner. It was claimed that Turner had contributed to a number of articles in the press that resisted the Government's proposed reform to the Gender Recognition Act, with Belcher suggesting that trans suicides had increased as a result.

Belcher ran as a Liberal Democrat in the election for Wokingham Borough Council in 2016 but lost by 122 votes to the Conservative candidate. Later that year, she was selected to replace Duncan Hames in his former Parliamentary seat of Chippenham, where she was unsuccessful in the 2017 general election against the incumbent Conservative, Michelle Donelan. She was re-selected as Chippenham's Liberal Democrat candidate for the 2019 general election, and she lost again.

Belcher successfully contested the Corsham Pickwick division in the 2021 Wiltshire Council election, winning with 51% of the vote and an 11.94% majority over the second-placing Conservative Party candidate.

Belcher was appointed Officer of the Order of the British Empire (OBE) in the 2023 New Year Honours for services to the transgender community.

References 

Living people
1963 births
Political activists
Liberal Democrats (UK) parliamentary candidates
English LGBT politicians
Transgender politicians
Transgender women
Transgender rights activists
Alumni of the University of Leeds
Liberal Democrats (UK) councillors
Members of Wiltshire Council
Women councillors in England
Officers of the Order of the British Empire